As a solo artist, American singer Gerard Way has released one studio album, one extended play (EP) and eleven singles. He started his solo career after the disbandment of rock band My Chemical Romance.

Albums

Studio albums

Extended plays

Singles

As lead artist

As featured artist

Music videos

Notes

References

My Chemical Romance
Discographies of American artists